Persatuan Sepakbola Muaro Jambi (simply known as PS Muaro Jambi) is an Indonesian football club based in Muaro Jambi Regency, Jambi. They currently compete in the Liga 3. The club plays its home matches at the Tri Lomba Juang KONI Stadium.

Honours
 Liga 3 Jambi
 Runner-up: 2021
 Jambi Governor Cup
 Runner-up: 2022

References

Football clubs in Indonesia
Football clubs in Jambi
Association football clubs established in 1999
1999 establishments in Indonesia